Ceromitia is a genus of moths in the Adelidae family. 
 
It consists of primitive moths mainly found in Africa and South America.

Species
Source:
 Ceromitia albosparsa
 Ceromitia alternipunctella
 Ceromitia amphichroa
 Ceromitia aphroneura
 Ceromitia arata
 Ceromitia atelopis
 Ceromitia auricrinis
 Ceromitia autoscia
 Ceromitia benedicta
 Ceromitia bipartita
 Ceromitia bipectinifera
 Ceromitia brevilobata
 Ceromitia centrologa
 Ceromitia cerochlora
 Ceromitia chalcocapna
 Ceromitia chionocrossa
 Ceromitia chrysomitra
 Ceromitia crinigerella
 Ceromitia cuneella
 Ceromitia decepta
 Ceromitia delta
 Ceromitia descripta
 Ceromitia devia
 Ceromitia dicksoni
 Ceromitia durbanica
 Ceromitia eccentra
 Ceromitia elongatella
 Ceromitia eremarcha
 Ceromitia exalbata
 Ceromitia fuscipunctella
 Ceromitia geminata
 Ceromitia gigantea
 Ceromitia glandularis
 Ceromitia graptosema
 Ceromitia grisata
 Ceromitia heteroloba
 Ceromitia holosticta
 Ceromitia ilyodes
 Ceromitia impura
 Ceromitia indigna
 Ceromitia ingeminans
 Ceromitia intermedia
 Ceromitia iolampra
 Ceromitia iolitha
 Ceromitia laninensis
 Ceromitia laureata
 Ceromitia leptosticta
 Ceromitia libropis
 Ceromitia lizeri
 Ceromitia macrograpta
 Ceromitia melanodesma
 Ceromitia melanostrota
 Ceromitia mellicoma
 Ceromitia mioclina
 Ceromitia mitrata
 Ceromitia monopectinifera
 Ceromitia multipunctata
 Ceromitia nerina
 Ceromitia ochrodyta
 Ceromitia ochrotricha
 Ceromitia palyntis
 Ceromitia phaeoceros
 Ceromitia phaeocoma
 Ceromitia phaeocomoides
 Ceromitia phyrsima
 Ceromitia pilularis
 Ceromitia praetexta
 Ceromitia pucaraensis
 Ceromitia punctulata
 Ceromitia resonans
 Ceromitia schajovskoii
 Ceromitia sciographa
 Ceromitia simpliciella
 Ceromitia spatolodes
 Ceromitia spilodesma
 Ceromitia sporaea
 Ceromitia stathmodes
 Ceromitia synchroma
 Ceromitia synneura
 Ceromitia systelitis
 Ceromitia transtrifera
 Ceromitia trigoniferella
 Ceromitia trilobata
 Ceromitia turpisella
 Ceromitia tyrochlora
 Ceromitia unguiphora
 Ceromitia vansoni
 Ceromitia viscida
 Ceromitia wahlbergi
 Ceromitia xanthocoma

Notes and references

External links 
 

Adelidae
Adeloidea genera
Taxa named by Philipp Christoph Zeller